William Crawford (1833 – 1 July 1890) was an English miner, trade unionist, and a Liberal politician.

Crawford was born at Cullercoats Northumberland and worked in Hartley Coal Mines from the age of 10. In 1862 he actively opposed the attempt of the Northumberland mine owners to impose the system of yearly hiring. He became Secretary of the Durham Miners' Association in 1863, and spoke frequently at the Durham Miner's Gala  He was briefly secretary of the breakaway Northumberland Miners' Mutual Confident Association.
 
In 1885 Crawford was elected Member of Parliament for Mid Durham and held the seat until his death aged 57. From 1889 to 1890 he was a member of the Institute of Mining Engineers. Crawford was a chief promoter of the College of the Venerable Bede, Durham and acted as its treasurer until his death.

References

External links 
 

1833 births
1890 deaths
Liberal Party (UK) MPs for English constituencies
UK MPs 1885–1886
UK MPs 1886–1892
English miners
British trade union leaders
People from Cullercoats
Politicians from Tyne and Wear
Trade unionists from Tyne and Wear
Members of the Parliamentary Committee of the Trades Union Congress
19th-century British businesspeople